Srđan Žakula (Serbian Cyrillic: Срђан Жакула; born 22 March 1979) is a Serbian football former player. He played as a goalkeeper for Radnički Šid last, and then retired and became goalkeeping coach.

Honours
Vojvodina
 Serbian Cup: 2013–14

External links
 Srbijafudbal profile
 

1979 births
Living people
People from Plitvička Jezera
Serbs of Croatia
Serbian footballers
Association football goalkeepers
FK Mladost Apatin players
FK Hajduk Kula players
FK Radnički Sombor players
FK Vojvodina players
Serbian SuperLiga players
FC Unirea Urziceni players
Liga I players
Serbian expatriate footballers
Expatriate footballers in Romania
Serbian expatriate sportspeople in Romania